The white-tailed shrike-tyrant (Agriornis albicauda) is a species of bird in the family Tyrannidae. It is found in Argentina, Bolivia, Chile, Ecuador, and Peru. At 25–28 cm (10–11 in) long, it is a very large flycatcher, second only to the great shrike-tyrant in size.

Its natural habitats are subtropical or tropical high-altitude shrubland, subtropical or tropical high-altitude grassland, arable land, and pastureland. It is threatened by habitat loss.

References

External links
Species factsheet – BirdLife International

white-tailed shrike-tyrant
Birds of the Ecuadorian Andes
Birds of the Puna grassland
white-tailed shrike-tyrant
white-tailed shrike-tyrant
Taxonomy articles created by Polbot